C.C.S. was the first studio album of the British blues outfit CCS, led by guitarist Alexis Korner. To avoid confusion with the group's second album with the same name, the album is often called "Whole Lotta Love", due to the inclusion of the Led Zeppelin song. In the UK, "Boom Boom" was issued as the A-side of the single, however "Whole Lotta Love" charted at number 13 on the UK Official Charts. In the US, the single charted at number 58 on the Billboard Hot 100, while the album only charted at number 197 on the Billboard 200.

Track listing

Side One
 "Boom Boom" (John Lee Hooker) – 3:32
 "(I Can't Get No) Satisfaction" (Mick Jagger, Keith Richards) – 4:30
 "Waiting Song" (Peter Thorup) – 4:32
 "Lookin' for Fun" (Ole Fick, Peter Thorup) – 3:59
 "Whole Lotta Love" (Jimmy Page, Willie Dixon, John Bonham, John Paul Jones, Robert Plant) – 3:41

Side Two
 "Living in the Past" (Ian Anderson) - instrumental in 5/4 time signature – 3:46
 "Sunrise" (Alexis Korner) – 5:14
 "Dos Cantos" (John Cameron) – 8:05
 "Wade in the Water" (John Cameron) – 2:54

Personnel

Musicians
 Alexis Korner, Peter Thorup – vocals
 Alan Parker – guitar
 Spike Heatley, Herbie Flowers – bass
 Barry Morgan, Tony Carr – drums
 Bill Le Sage, Jim Lawless – percussion
 John Cameron – piano, conductor, arranger, liner notes
 Bob Efford, Danny Moss, Harold McNair, Ron Ross, Tony Coe – saxophone
 Greg Bowen, Harold Beckett, Henry Lowther, Kenny Wheeler, Les Condon, Tony Fisher – trumpet
 Bill Geldard, Brian Perrin, Don Lusher, John Marshall – trombone

Technical
 Mickie Most – producer
 Peter Bown – engineer
 Christina – photography

References

1970 debut albums
CCS (band) albums
Albums produced by Mickie Most
Rak Records albums
Albums arranged by John Cameron (musician)
Albums conducted by John Cameron (musician)